Bassin-Bleu is a commune in the Port-de-Paix Arrondissement, in the Nord-Ouest department of Haiti. It has 33,926 inhabitants. Bassin-Bleu is a home to a waterfall/pond also called Bassin-Bleu. They are a main tourist attraction. Bassin-Bleu in the Nord-Ouest department has a river running through it call Les Trois-Rivieres. The Bassin-Bleu with the waterfall is in the South of Haiti near the city of Jacmel.

References

Populated places in Nord-Ouest (department)
Communes of Haiti